Salvia was an Illyrian settlement in the region of Liburnia of the Illyrian tribe of Delmatae. The exact location is unknown, it is mentioned together with Stridon, possibly at Bosansko Grahovo.

See also 
List of settlements in Illyria

References 

Former populated places in the Balkans
Cities in ancient Illyria
Illyrian Bosnia and Herzegovina